Mohamed Hussein Roble (born February 1968) is a Somali politician who was the prime minister of Somalia from 23 September 2020. to 25 June 2022.

Background 
He was born in Hobyo in February 1968. He received a BSc in Civil Engineering from the Somali National University, and later attended the KTH Royal Institute of Technology in Stockholm, Sweden where he completed an MA in environmental engineering and sustainable engineering. Before his appointment as Prime Minister he served as a member of the United Nations at the International Labour Organization in Nairobi, Kenya as  technically advisor an environmental engineer.

Political career

Appointment as Prime Minister 
He was appointed to the post of prime minister by Mohamed Abdullahi Mohamed in September 2020. In his initial address to parliament after taking office he pledged to form a cabinet which would steer Somalia through the 2021 election transion.  Roble re-appointed Khadar Mohamed Gulaid as deputy prime minister and he appointed 26 ministers to his cabinet, 15 of whom are from the previous cabinet. The new cabinet includes 17 state ministers, and 4 women.

2020 Galkayo bombing 

On December 18, 2020, Roble was due to address a gathering at a stadium in Galkayo. Minutes before his arrival, a suicide bomber blew himself up outside the stadium, killing seven civilians and three soldiers. Roble offered his deepest condolences to the families and friends of the victims and called for unity among the Somali people in the struggle against terrorism to promote peace and development in the country.

2021 elections 

On 1 May 2021, Roble was given the mandate by the Federal Government of Somalia for overseeing the election process according to the agreement reached on 17 September 2020 by the National Consultative Forum and the Baidoa Framework of 16 February 2021 as well as security arrangements for elections.

Freedom of the Press 

On World Press Freedom Day, May 3 2021, Roble congratulated Somali journalists, praising them for their sacrifice, resilience and commitment. He also guaranteed journalists safety and access to information, particularly through the upcoming elections, encouraging them to approach their work with responsibility and professionalism.

Tension with President Farmajo 
In September 2021, Farmajo suspended Roble's executive powers following a row over his suspension of former NISA head Fahad Yasin over the murder investigation of Ikran Tahlil Farah. 

On 28 December 2021, Roble called on Farmajo to immediately step aside and concentrate on the campaign trail for the forthcoming elections.

On 10 January, Somali leaders announced they struck a deal to complete parliamentary elections by February 25, after repeated delays that have threatened the stability of the country. The agreement was reached after several days of talks hosted by Roble with state leaders aimed at ending an impasse over the polls.

After President Hassan Sheikh Mohamud began his second term on 9 June 2022, he appointed Hamza Abdi Barre to replace Roble as prime minister. Barre was approved in a vote by the House of the People on 25 June 2022.

References

External links

Living people
1963 births
21st-century prime ministers of Somalia
Prime Ministers of Somalia
People from Mudug